Enrique Eguía Seguí (born 9 December 1962) is an Argentine prelate of the Roman Catholic Church. He has been auxiliary bishop of Buenos Aires since 2008.

Life 
Born in Buenos Aires, Eguía was ordained to the priesthood on 3 December 1988.

On 4 September 2008, he was appointed auxiliary bishop of Buenos Aires and titular bishop of Cissi. Eguía received his episcopal consecration on the following October 11 from Jorge Mario Bergoglio, archbishop of Buenos Aires, the later Pope Francis, with auxiliary Bishops Óscar Vicente Ojea Quintana, auxiliary of Buenos Aires, and Carlos María Franzini of Rafaela  as co-consecrators.

References

External links 

 

1962 births
21st-century Roman Catholic bishops in Argentina
Living people
Roman Catholic bishops of Buenos Aires